Vieux-Fort may refer to:

 Vieux Fort Quarter in Saint Lucia
 Vieux Fort, Saint Lucia, a town within the above
 Vieux-Fort, Guadeloupe
 Vieux-Fort, Quebec, a small community in Canada